Catilluc District is one of thirteen districts of the province San Miguel in Peru.

References